The mission of the Rudin Center for Transportation Policy and Management is to create and disseminate new ideas in transportation policy and planning that will foster greater economic development and opportunity in a more sustainable and just society.

The center, based at the Robert F. Wagner Graduate School of Public Service at New York University, works with public, private and non-profit partners in supporting innovative research, convening thinkers and policy-makers from around the region and the world, and training students and leaders in the field. It seeks to focus attention on the linkages between transportation policy and other critical regional and national issues such as housing, economic development, energy security, health care, and education. The center's current director is Mitchell L. Moss.

Established in 1996 and named in 2000 for New York City civic leader, founding chairman of the Association for a Better New York, and NYU alumnus Lewis Rudin, the Rudin Center is located in the historic Puck Building at 295 Lafayette Street in Manhattan.

External links
Rudin Center Official Site

New York University